Per Vesterlund is a paralympic athlete from Sweden competing mainly in category T52 track events.

Per has competed in three Paralympics since his first games in 1996.  There he competed in the 400m, 800m, 1500m and marathon winning the gold medal in the 1500m and the bronze in the 800m.  At his second games in 2000 he moved from the marathon to the 5000m but still did the 400m, 800m and 1500m this time only managing a silver in the 1500m.  His last appearance was in 2004 Summer Paralympics where he competed in the 800m, 1500m, 5000m and marathon but he was unable to add further to his medal collection.

References

External links
 

Year of birth missing (living people)
Living people
Swedish wheelchair racers
Paralympic athletes of Sweden
Paralympic gold medalists for Sweden
Paralympic silver medalists for Sweden
Paralympic bronze medalists for Sweden
Paralympic medalists in athletics (track and field)
Athletes (track and field) at the 1996 Summer Paralympics
Athletes (track and field) at the 2000 Summer Paralympics
Athletes (track and field) at the 2004 Summer Paralympics
Medalists at the 1996 Summer Paralympics
Medalists at the 2000 Summer Paralympics
20th-century Swedish people